The men's sanda (as Sanshou) 60 kg competition at the 2010 Asian Games in Guangzhou, China was held from 14 November to 17 November at the Nansha Gymnasium.

A total of sixteen competitors from sixteen countries competed in this event, limited to fighters whose body weight was less than 60 kilograms.

Mohsen Mohammadseifi from Iran won the gold medal after beating Kim Jun-yul of South Korea in gold medal bout 2–0, Mohammadseifi won the first period 5–0 and finished the match in 2nd period by two fall-offs. The bronze medal was shared by M. Bimoljit Singh from India and Nguyễn Minh Thông of Vietnam.

Athletes from Laos, Nepal, Mongolia and Kyrgyzstan shared the fifth place.

Schedule
All times are China Standard Time (UTC+08:00)

Results
Legend
AV — Absolute victory
KO — Won by knockout

References

External links
Official website

Men's sanda 60 kg